Robert Walter Mitchler (June 4, 1920 – April 19, 2012) was an American politician and businessman.

Born in Aurora, Illinois, Mitchler went to the Aurora public schools. He served in the United States Navy during World War II and the Korean War. He received his bachelor's degree from Aurora College. Mitchler lived in Oswego, Illinois and worked for the Northern Illinois Gas Company. Mitchler was involved with the Republican Party. Mitchler served in the Illinois Senate from 1965 to 1981. He died at his home in Oswego, Illinois.

Notes

External links

1920 births
2012 deaths
People from Aurora, Illinois
People from Oswego, Illinois
Military personnel from Illinois
Aurora University alumni
Businesspeople from Illinois
Republican Party Illinois state senators
20th-century American businesspeople
United States Navy personnel of World War II